This is a list of foreign players who play in the Uzbekistan Super League, and Uzbekistan Pro League in the season 2020. The following players have been born outside Uzbekistan and have not been capped for the Uzbek national team at any level. From season 2020 there is a limit on foreign players, 4+1, one from Asia, and three from the rest of the world.

In bold: players who have played at least one Super League game in the current season (2020), and are still at a club for which they have played. This does not include current players of a Super League club who have not played a Super League game in the current season.

Details correct as of 26 January 2020

Armenia 
 Aram Voskanyan — Lokomotiv Tashkent (2010)
 Romik Khachatryan — Lokomotiv Tashkent (2012—2013)
 Zhora Hovhannisyan — Lokomotiv Tashkent (2012—2013), Pakhtakor (2013—2014)
 Ruslan Koryan — Lokomotiv Tashkent (2015)

Azerbaijan 
 Elshan Gambarov — Navbahor (1998, 2002), Dinamo Samarkand (2000—2002), Mashal (2003) 
 — Mashal (2005-2010)

Belarus 
Oleg Syrokvashko – Navbahor Namangan (1993)
Alexander Petukhov — FK Andijan
Vitaly Rushnitsky – FC Shurtan Guzar (2011–2012)
 Sergei Krot – FC Nasaf (2011)
 Mikalay Ryndzyuk – Mash'al Mubarek (2010–2011) Dinamo Samarqand (2011)Navbahor   (2012)
 Vital Panasyuk – Navbahor   (2012)
 Igor Tymonyuk – Mash'al Mubarek (2015, 2017)
 Mikita Bukatkin – Mash'al Mubarek (2015)
 Alyaksey Khaletski – Mash'al Mubarek (2015)
 Terentiy Lutsevich — Neftchi (2017)
Uladzislaw Kasmynin — AGMK (2017–2018, 2019)
 Dzmitry Kamarowski – FC Neftchi (2017)
Syarhey Kantsavy – FC Neftchi (2017)
Sergey Rusetsky – Buxoro (2018)

Bulgaria 
 Nikolay Chipev — Dinamo Samarkand (2015), Bukhara (2015)
Petar Denchev — Navbahor (2014-2015)

Bosnia and Herzegovina 
 Aleksandar Brđanin – Mash'al Mubarek (2010)
Samir Bekrić — Bunyodkor (2014–2016)
Nemanja Janicic — FC Lokomotiv (2015–2017)

Croatia 
 Jurica Buljat — Bunyodkor (2016), Pakhtakor (2017)
 Ivor Weitzer — Bukhara (2017)

Estonia 
 Vladislav Ivanov – Mash'al Mubarek (2015)

France 
 Mohammad Bindi Mustaffa — Lokomotiv Tashkent (2012)

Georgia 
Kakha Gogoladze – FC Nasaf (1998)
 Giorgi Krasovski — Andijan (2008)
  – FC Nasaf (2008)
  – Mash'al Mubarek (2009)
  – FK Buxoro (2011–2012, 2013–2014), FC AGMK (2013), Qizilqum Zarafshon (2015–2016)
 Kakhi Makharadze  — Pakhtakor (2011—2015), Sogdiana Jizzakh (2019) Lokomotiv Tashkent (2009—2010, 2016—2018, 2020 present)
 Levan Mdivnishvili — Andijan (2012)
 Mikheil Alavidze — FC Andijon (2012)
 Irakli Klimiashvili — Pakhtakor (2011—2012)
 Giorgi Megreladze – FC Shurtan Guzar (2012–2013)
 Mikhail Kakaladze – FK Buxoro (2011–2012)
 Shota Grigalashvili – FC AGMK (2017)
 Elgujja Grigalashvili – Qizilqum Zarafshon (2018–2019), FC AGMK (2019–
 Lasha Totadze – Qizilqum Zarafshon (2019)
 Mate Vatsadze – Qizilqum Zarafshon (2019) FC AGMK (2020 present)
 Vili Isiani – FK Buxoro (2019)
 Jaba Lipartia – FK Buxoro (2019)

Finland 
 Toni Lindberg - Mash'al Mubarek (2012)

Hungary 
 Péter Vörös — Lokomotiv Tashkent (2009—2010)

Israel 
 Gidi Kanyuk — Pakhtakor (2017)

Kazakhstan 
 – FK Dinamo Samarqand (1991)
 Kairat Utabayev — Pakhtakor (2000—2003), Andijon (2009)
 – Traktor Tashkent (2003–2004)
Arsen Tlekhugov – FK Buxoro (2008)
Nurpeys Turekulov — NBU Osiyo (2010)
 — Mash'al Mubarek(2010)
Ilya Fomitchev — Mash'al Mubarek (2012)
Valery Fomichev – FC AGMK (2015)
Aleksandr Kirov — Kokand 1912 (2015)
Kiril Pasichnik — FC Buxoro (2017)

Latvia 
 Pāvels Davidovs — Mashal (2011)
 Andrejs Perepļotkins — FC Nasaf (2011—2012)
 Romāns Mickevičs — FC Andijon (2020 present)

Lithuania 
 Virginijus Baltušnikas — Pakhtakor (1991)
 Gintaras Kvitkauskas — Pakhtakor (1991)
 Tadas Grazhiunas — FK Buxoro (2011), FC Andijon (2012) 
 Pavelas Leusas — Qizilqum Zarafshon (2011)
 Arturas Fomenka — FK Andijon (2008), FC AGMK (2008—2010), Sogdiana Jizzakh (2011), FK Buxoro (2011), Navbahor (2012), Lokomotiv Tashkent (2012), FC Shurtan Guzar (2013)
 Egidius Mažius — FK Dinamo Samarqand (2011)
Darvydas Šernas – Sogdiana Jizzakh (2018)

Macedonia 
 Stevica Ristić — Bunyodkor (2010)
 Dušhan Savić — Pakhakor (2011)
 Xhelil Asani – Mash'al Mubarek (2018)

Moldova 
 Oleg Bejenar – FC Nasaf (2000)
  – FC Nasaf (2009)
Gheorghe Boghiu – FC Nasaf (2010)
Constantin Mandrîcenco – FC Dinamo Samarqand (2017)
 Adrian Cașcaval – Neftchi Fergana (2015), FC AGMK (2015)
Alexandru Melenciuc – Sogdiana Jizzakh (2011, 2013–2014), Navbahor Namangan (2015–2016)
Аlеxei Cаsian – Andijon (2011)
Denis Romanenco – Dinamo Samarqand (2010), Navbahor Namangan (2011–2012)
 Alexandru Onica – Lokomotiv Tashkent (2013), Neftchi Fergana (2014)
 Vadim Cemirtan — FC Buxoro (2016, 2018), FC AGMK (2018), FC Bunyodkor (2017)
 Maxim Iurcu — Qizilqum Zarafshon (2017)
Radu Rogac – FC Dinamo Samarqand (2017)
 Artyom Lytvyakov — FC Andijon (2020 present)

Montenegro 
Bojan Kaljević — Metalourg Bekabad (2008–2010, 2011–2012), FC Bunyodkor (2010)
Milan Nicolić — FC Pakhtakor Tashkent (2009)
Predrag Vujović – FC Shurtan Guzar (2011), FK Buxoro (2014), FC Andijon (2015)
Ivan Bošković — Nasaf Qarshi (2011—2012)
Sanibal Orahovac — FC Pakhtakor Tashkent (2012)
 Damir Kojašević — Lokomotiv (2015)
Dejan Boljević — FC Nasaf (2016)
 Slaven Stjepanović — FC Lokomotiv (2016)
 Adnan Orahovac — FC Pakhtakor (2015-2017) FC Dinamo Samarqand (2017)
 Marko Simić — FC Pakhtakor (2017–2019)
 Darko Nikač — Navbahor Namangan (2018)
 Ivan Fatić — FC Buxoro (2019)
 Igor Zonjić — FC AGMK (2019 present)
 Slavko Damjanović — PFC Lokomotiv Tashkent (2020 present)

Poland 
 Michał Pawlik — FC Nasaf (2020 present)

Romania 
 Bogdan Hauși — FK Buxoro (2015)

Russia 
 Gleb Panfyorov – Dinamo Samarqand (1992)
  – Navbahor Namangan (1992)
 Sergei Ivanov – Navbahor Namangan (1992)
 Andrei Zaikin — Neftchi Ferghana (1992)
 Albert Tsarayev — Neftchi Ferghana (1992—1993)
  – Pakhtakor Tashkent (1992), FK Buxoro (2007)
 Andrey Afanasyev — Navbahor (1997)
 Dmitri Batynkov – Navbahor Namangan (1995–1997)
 Dmitry Bystrov – Navbahor Namangan (1995–1997)
 Grigori Melikov – Lokomotiv Tashkent (2006), FK Buxoro (2007, 2008–2009)
  – FK Buxoro (2007)
  – Navbahor Namangan (2009)
 Oleg Yezhurov — FK Andijan (2009)
 Aleksandr Filimonov – Lokomotiv Tashkent (2009–2010)
  — Lokomotiv Tashkent (2010, 2013—2014), Almalyk (2011—2013, 2015—2017)
 Vladimir Chekunov — Navbahor (2012)
 Andrey Usachev — Qizilqum (2012)
 Igor Golban — Kokand 1912 (2014—2015), Navbahor (2016),(2019 present) Nasaf (2016)
 Vladimir Argun — Kokand 1912 (2015)
Nikolai Pogrebnyak – Lokomotiv (2018)
 Vyacheslav Sushkin — FC Neftchi Fergana (2018)
  — Metalourg Bekabad (2018–2019)
Vlad Larinov – Buxoro (2018-
Yevgeni Cheremisin —Qizilqum (2018–2019)
Ivan Solovyov – Navbahor (2019)
Artyom Kulesha – Buxoro (2019)
 Dmitriy Ostrovskiy — FC Bunyodkor (2019)
 Sergei Tumasyan — Metalourg Bekabad (2019)
 Ruslan Margiev — Qizilqum Zarafshon (2019)
 Kirill Pogrebnyak — Lokomotiv Tashkent (2020 present)

Serbia 
 Bojan Miladinović – Pakhtakor (2009–2014)
Milan Nicolić — FC Pakhtakor Tashkent (2009)
 Saša Đorđević – FC Bunyodkor (2011)
 Slavoljub Đorđević – FC Bunyodkor (2012)
 Igor Petković – Mash'al Mubarek (2010–2012), FC AGMK (2012–2014)
 Milorad Janjuš – Pakhtakor (2010)
 Đorđe Ivelja – FC Nasaf (2010)
 Aleksandar Petrovic – FC Nasaf (2010)
 Miloš Trifunović – FC Bunyodkor(2010–2011), FC AGMK (2018)
 Bojan Mališić – Nasaf Qarshi (2011–2012)
 Milorad Resanovic – Mash'al Mubarek (2012)
 Aleksandar Alempijević – FC AGMK (2014), FC Bunyodkor (2016)
 Nemanja Jovanović – FC AGMK (2016), FC Andijon (2016), Qizilqum Zarafshon (2017–2018)
 Darko Stanojević – FC AGMK (2016), Navbahor Namangan (2017–2018), FC Surkhon (2019 present)
 Ognjen Krasić – FC Nasaf (2016)
 Dragan Ćeran – FC Nasaf (2016–2018) Pakhtakor Tashkent (2018 present)
 Nikola Valentić – kokand 1912 (2016–2017)
 Dušan Mićić – FC Bunyodkor (2017)
  – kokand 1912 (2016–2017)
 Tomislav Pajović – Navbahor Namangan (2017–2018)
 Nenad Injac – Navbahor Namangan (2017–2018)
 Filip Rajevac – kokand 1912 (2017), Bunyodkor (2018), PFC Lokomotiv Tashkent (2019)
 Milan Spremo – Kokand 1912 (2018)
 Marko Klisura – FK Buxoro (2018) (2019)
 Nikola Milinković – Sogdiana Jizzakh (2018–2019)
 Miloš Simonović – Sogdiana Jizzakh (2018)
 Marko Milic - Kokand 1912 (2018), (2019)
 Igor Jelić – FC AGMK (2017), PFC Lokomotiv Tashkent (2018–2019)
 Jovan Đokić – FC AGMK (2018, 2020 present) FC Lokomotiv (2019)
 Vladimir Bubanja – FC AGMK (2018), FC Surkhon (2019 present)
 Slavko Lukić – FC Nasaf (2018), Navbahor (2019)
 Milan Mitrović – Sogdiana Jizzakh (2018 present)
 Radosav Aleksic – FC Andijon (2019)
 Marko Zoćević – FC AGMK (2019)
 Miroljub Kostić – FC AGMK (2019)
 Marko Kolaković – Sogdiana Jizzakh (2020 present)
 Ivan Josović – Kokand 1912 (2020 present)

Slovakia 
 Marián Dirnbach — FC Nasaf (2008)
 Jan Kozak — FC Bunyodkor (2012)

Slovenia 
 Rok Roj — FC Nasaf (2015—2017)

Spain 
 Carles Coto — FC Bunyodkor (2014)

Switzerland 
 Eren Derdiyok — Pakhtakor Tashkent (2020 present)

Ukraine 
 — Navbahor Namangan (1988—1991), Traktor Tashkent (1996), FK Samarqand-Dinamo (1997)
 Yuriy Yaroshenko — Navbahor Namangan (1993)
 — FC Dustlik (1998)
 — FC Pakhtakor Tashkent (2001)
 — FC Pakhtakor Tashkent (2001)
  — Navbahor Namangan (2003)
Serhiy Yesin — Navbahor Namangan (2003)
  — Navbahor Namangan (2004)
 Oleksandr Tkachuk — Qizilqum Zarafshon (2008—2009) 
 Mykola Pavlenko — FC Nasaf (2008—2009) 
 Anatoliy Matkevych — FC Nasaf  (2008) 
 Oleh Mochulyak — FK Buxoro (2008) 
  — Qizilqum Zarafshon (2010—2011), FK Samarqand-Dinamo (2011—2015)
 Serhiy Hrybanov – FC Dinamo Samarqand (2011)
 Sergey Litovchenko — Lokomotiv Tashkent (2010)
 Andriy Yakovlyev — FC Nasaf (2010)
 Oleksiy Khramtsov — Navbahor Namangan (2010)
 Yuriy Tselykh — Navbahor Namangan (2010), FK Andijan (2011)
 Dmytro Kolodin — Qizilqum Zarafshon (2010)
  —Qizilqum Zarafshon (2011)
 Dmytro Kozachenko — FC Nasaf (2011)
 Oleksandr Polovkov – FK Andijan (2012)
 Andrey Yerokhin  – FK Samarqand-Dinamo (2012)
 Andrey Sirotyuk – Metalourg Bekabad   (2012)
 Andrey Melnychuk – Navbahor Namangan (2012)
 Oleksandar Tarasenko – FK Buxoro (2012)
 Volodymyr Kilikevych — FK Samarqand-Dinamo (2013), FK Buxoro (2013)
 Oleksandr Pyschur – FC Bunyodkor (2013—2014), Navbahor Namangan (2016), FC Shurtan Guzar (2017)
 Vyacheslav Shevchenko — Lokomotiv Tashkent (2014), Qizilqum Zarafshon (2015—2017)
 Ruslan Kachur — Navbahor Namangan (2014)
Serhiy Symonenko — FC Bunyodkor (2014)
 Oleksandr Kablash — Sogdiana Jizzakh (2014), Navbahor Namangan (2015)
 Yaroslav Martynyuk — FC AGMK (2016)
 Vladyslav Pavlenko – Mash'al Mubarek (2017)
 Andriy Derkach – Mash'al Mubarek (2016), Qizilqum (2017)
  – Neftchi Fergana (2018), FC Andijon (2019)
 Yevhen Chumak – FC Bunyodkor (2019)
 Oleksandr Kasyan – Navbahor (2019), FC Surkhon (2020 present)
 Volodymyr Bayenko – FC Buxoro (2017), (2019)
 Dmytro Zozulya – FC Andijon (2020 present)
 Dmytro Kozban – FC Buxoro (2020 present)

Brazil 
 Fabio Pinto — Pakhtakor (2001)
  — Lokomotiv Tashkent (2006—2008), Dinamo Samarkand (2009), Khorezm (2009—2010)
 Luizao — Bunyodkor (2008—2009)
 Rivaldo — Bunyodkor (2008—2010)
 Leomar Rodrigues — Bunyodkor (2009)
 Joao Victor — Bunyodkor (2009—2010)
 Edson Ramos — Bunyodkor (2009—2010)
 Denilson — Bunyodkor (2010)
 Tiago Bezerra  — Pakhtakor (2017—2018)
 Nivaldo – PFC Lokomotiv Tashkent (2018)
 Lucas Oliveria De Cunha – Surkhan (2019)
 Dougllas Do Nacsimento Rugilho – Surkhan (2019)
 Elivelto — Sogdiana Jizzakh (2020 present)

Chile 
 José Luis Villanueva — Bunyodkor (2008—2009)

Canada 
 Milovan Kapor  – Buxoro (2019)

Nicaragua 
 Ariagner Smith – Qizilqum Zarafshon (2019)

United States 
 Graham Smith – FC AGMK (2017)

Gabon 
Thibault Tchicaya – FC AGMK (2010–2011)

Ghana 
 Richard Sewe – Mash'al Mubarek (2007)
 Jerry Emonkpari – Metalourg Bekabad (2010)

Guinea-Bissau 
 Esmaël Gonçalves — Pakhtakor (2018)

Burkina Faso 
 Mohamed Kone — Lokomotiv Tashkent (2017)

Ivory Coast 
 Taïna Adama Soro - Shurtan (2012)
 Gnohere Krizo — Lokomotiv Tashkent (2017)

Niger 
 Olivier Bonnes – Kokand 1912 (2019)

Nigeria 
 Patrick Agbo — Navbahor (2005—2006, 2011), Quruvchi (2007), Dinamo Samarkand (2008), Shurtan (2009—2010, 2011—2012)
 Benedict Opara — Pakhtakor (2005)
 Uche Iheruome — Pakhtakor (2005—2010), Shurtan (2008) 
 Wilson Rapposo — Lokomotiv Tashkent Shimshiqkol F.C. (2007)
 David Oniya — Dinamo Samarkand (2007—2011), Bunyodkor (2011), Soghdiana (2012), Bukhara (2012—2013), Neftchi Ferghana (2014)
 Martin Izokho – Dinamo, FC Andijon (2008-2010)
 Samuel Akanji – Shurtan (2008-2009) Qizilqum (2009-2010)
 Emmanuel Obide Okechukwu - Qizilqum (2012)
Alex Ojiaka - Navbahor (2012)
Olabiran Muyiwa – Lokomotiv Tashkent  (2017)

Swaziland 
 Sandile Hlatjwako – Nasaf Qarshi (2008)

Tunisia 
 Chaker Zouaghi — FC AGMK (2014), Bunyodkor (2015—2016)

Australia 
 David Carney — Bunyodkor (2012)
 Petar Franjic – FC AGMK (2014)
 Rostyn Griffiths — Pakhtakor (2017–2018)
 Steven Lustica – FC Qizilqum (2019)

Iraq 
 Haidar Abdul-Razzaq — FC Andijon (2011)

Japan 
 Naoya Shibamura — Pakhtakor (2012), FK Buxoro (2012—2013)
 Minori Sato — Bunyodkor (2014—2016)
 Tomoki Muramatsu — Mashal (2017)

Kyrgyzstan 
 Karim Izrailov — Mashal (2010), Bunyodkor (2011), Dinamo Samarkand (2011), Mashal (2012)
 Emil Kenzhesariyev – Bunyodkor (2011-2012)
Farhat Musabekov - FC AGMK (2017)
Pavel Matyash — FC AGMK (2018)
Akhlidin Israilov - Andijon (2019)
 Sherzod Shakirov - Sogdiana (2019)

South Korea 
 Choi Hyun Yeon — Navbahor (2016)
 Cho Seok Jae — Lokomotiv Tashkent (2018)
Kim Dong-hee –Soghdiana (2018)

Tajikistan 
 Valeriy Gorbach — Bukhara (1991)
 Tokhirjon Muminov — FC Andijon (1996—1998, 2000—2002)
 Akmal Kholmatov — Neftchi Ferghana (1996—2008, 2014—2016), Pakhtakor  (2008—2010), Lokomotiv Tashkent (2012—2014), Shurtan (2017), Andijan (2017)
 Alisher Tuychiev — Yangiyer (1996, 1999), Nasaf (1997-1999), Guliston (2000), Mashal (2002), Metallurg Bekabad (2008—2009)
 Shuhrat Jabborov — Soghdiana (1998—1999), Dinamo Samarkand (2000—2002, 2003—2004)
 Mukhsin Mukhamadiev — Bukhara (1999), Dinamo Samarkand (2000—2001)
 Alexander Frank — Qizilqum (2011—2012)
 Farhod Tohirov — Andijan (2012)
 Umedzhon Sharipov — Mash'al Mubarek (2017)
 Jahongir Aliev — Nasaf (2018)
 Zoir Juraboev – Metallurg Bekabad (2018)
 Fatkhullo Fatkhuloev — FK Buxoro (2019)
 Amirbek Juraboev — Navbahor Namangan (2019)
 Davron Ergashev — FC Bunyodkor (2020 present)
 Oybek Abdugafforov — FC Andijon (2020 present)

Turkmenistan 
 Artyom Nikitenko  - Olmaliq FK
Amir Gurbani - FK Buxoro
Maksim Kazankov- - Lokomotiv Tashkent
Maksim Belyh – Navbahor Namangan
  — Pakhtakor (2000—2001)
 Didar Hajiyev — Navbahor (2005—2009), Nasaf (2010)
 Daýançgylyç Urazow — Neftchi Ferghana (2006), Soghdiana (2006, 2008)
 Artur Gevorkyan — Shurtan (2006—2009), Pakhtakor (2010), Nasaf (2011—2016), Lokomotiv Tashkent (2016), Qizilqum(2017-2018)
 Murat Hamrayev — Dinamo Samarkand (2007—2008), Almalyk (2009, 2010—2011) 
  — Almalyk (2008)
 Bahtiýar Hojaahmedow — Bukhara (2010)
 Pavel Harchik — Qizilqum (2011), Almalyk (2012)
 Alik Haydarov — Mashal (2011—2013)
 Maksatmurat Shamuradov — Almalyk (2013—2014)
 Elman Tagayev — Andijan (2016) Navbahor Namangan  (2019)
 Arslanmyrat Amanow – FC AGMK (2015–2016, 2020 present) FC Buxoro (2018) Lokomotiv (2019)
 Selim Nurmuradov — FC Bunyodkor (2020 present)

See also
2020 Uzbekistan Super League
2019 Uzbekistan Super League
2018 Uzbekistan Super League
2017 Uzbek League
2012 Uzbek League

Football in Uzbekistan